This is a list of people who served as Lord Lieutenant of Merionethshire. After 1762, all Lord Lieutenants were also Custos Rotulorum of Merionethshire. The office was abolished  on 31 March 1974, and the area is now covered by the Lord Lieutenant of Gwynedd and Lord Lieutenant of Clwyd.

Lord Lieutenants of Merionethshire to 1974
see Lord Lieutenant of Wales before 1694
Charles Talbot, 1st Duke of Shrewsbury 31 May 1694 – 10 March 1696
Charles Gerard, 2nd Earl of Macclesfield 10 March 1696 – 5 November 1701
William Stanley, 9th Earl of Derby 18 June 1702 – 5 November 1702
Hugh Cholmondeley, 1st Earl of Cholmondeley 2 December 1702 – 4 September 1713
Other Windsor, 2nd Earl of Plymouth 4 September 1713 – 21 October 1714
Hugh Cholmondeley, 1st Earl of Cholmondeley 21 October 1714 – 18 January 1725
George Cholmondeley, 2nd Earl of Cholmondeley 7 April 1725 – 7 May 1733
George Cholmondeley, 3rd Earl of Cholmondeley 14 June 1733 – 25 October 1760
vacant
William Vaughan 26 April 1762 – 12 April 1775
Sir Watkin Williams-Wynn, 4th Baronet 10 June 1775 – 1789
Watkin Williams 27 August 1789 – 4 December 1793
Sir Watkin Williams-Wynn, 5th Baronet 4 December 1793 – 6 January 1840
Edward Lloyd-Mostyn, 2nd Baron Mostyn 25 January 1840 – 17 March 1884
Robert Davies Pryce 17 May 1884 – 30 September 1891
W. R. M. Wynne 30 September 1891 – 25 February 1909
 Sir Arthur Osmond Williams, 1st Baronet 22 March 1909 – 28 January 1927
George Ormsby-Gore, 3rd Baron Harlech 22 February 1927 – 8 May 1938
William Ormsby-Gore, 4th Baron Harlech 22 June 1938 – 25 June 1957
Col. John Francis Williams-Wynne, C.B.E., D.S.O. 25 June 1957 – 31 March 1974

Deputy Lieutenants
Deputy Lieutenants traditionally supported the Lord-Lieutenant. There could be several deputy lieutenants at any time, depending on the population of the county. Their appointment did not terminate with the changing of the Lord-Lieutenant, but they usually retired at age 75. 

 Hugh Beaver Roberts, Esq (1820-1903) April 7, 1863 
 Romer Williams, Esq. 19 April 1901
 Lieutenant-Colonel George Frederick Scott 15 May 1901

References

 

 The Lord-Lieutenants Order 1973 (1973/1754)

1974 disestablishments in Wales
Merionethshire
Merionethshire